Kabali is a 2016 Indian Tamil-language crime drama film written and directed by Pa. Ranjith. It was produced by S. Thanu under his production company, V Creations. The film featured Rajinikanth as the titular character opposite Radhika Apte. The film features an ensemble cast consisting of Winston Chao, Kishore, Attakathi Dinesh, Sai Dhanshika, John Vijay, Nassar, Kalaiyarasan and Riythvika.

The film won 15 awards from 31 nominations; its direction, screenplay, performances of the cast members, and music have received the most attention from award groups.

Awards and nominations

See also 
 List of Tamil films of 2016

Notes

References

External links 
 Accolades for Kabali (film) at the Internet Movie Database

Kabali (film)